Arsenal Football Club is an English professional association football club based in Holloway, London. The club was formed in Woolwich in 1886 as Dial Square before it was shortly renamed to Royal Arsenal, and then Woolwich Arsenal in 1893. They became the first southern member admitted into the Football League in 1893, having spent their first four seasons solely participating in cup tournaments and friendlies. The club's name was shortened to Arsenal in 1914, a year after moving to Highbury. In spite of finishing fifth in the Second Division in 1915, Arsenal rejoined the First Division at the expense of local rivals Tottenham Hotspur when football resumed after the First World War. Since that time, they have not fallen below the first tier of the English football league system and hold the record for the longest uninterrupted time in the top flight.

In the 1930s, Arsenal were the dominant side of England, winning five league championships and two FA Cups. Their fortunes waned, but the club soon enjoyed infrequent periods of success, including Inter-Cities Fairs Cup triumph and a first league and cup double in the 1970s. During the late 1980s, Arsenal had built a side that threatened Liverpool's league dominance, and performed greatly in cup competitions. The club played an active role in the formation of the Premier League in 1992, won the FA Cup in 1993 and the European Cup Winners Cup in 1994 and two doubles followed in 1998 and 2002. Arsenal made league history in 2003–04 when they became the first team in a 38-game season to go unbeaten. In the 2000s, Arsenal were finalists in both the UEFA Cup and UEFA Champions League, and have since equalled Real Madrid's record for most consecutive seasons in the latter competition.

As of the end of the 2021–22 season, the club's first team have spent 106 seasons in the top division of English football, and 13 in the second. Their worst league finish to date is 10th in the second tier, their placing at the end of the 1896–97 season. Arsenal's best-ever start to a Premier League season came in 2022–23, when they won 9 of their first 10 matches. The club's longest period without a competitive honour is 17 years, between the 1953-54 and 1969–70 seasons. Ted Drake holds the record for most competitive goals in a single season for Arsenal; he scored 44 during the 1934–35 campaign. The table details the club's achievements in major competitions, and the top scorers for each season. Records of competitions such as the London Combination and the London War Cup are not included.

History
When Arsenal was founded in 1886 by munition workers' from Woolwich, the club resisted the lure of professionalism and remained an amateur side. Success in local cup competitions soon followed, and a tie against Derby County in the FA Cup on 17 January 1891 led to the opposition approaching two of Arsenal's players, in view of offering them professional contracts. Later that year the club resigned its membership of the Kent County and London Football Associationsboth amateur governing bodiesand voted to turn professional, a move which attracted criticism from many southern clubs. In 1893, the club received an invitation to join the Football League, which the board accepted. Arsenal played in the Second Division for eleven seasons, while also participating in regional competitions, the Southern Combination and United League. The club won promotion in 1904, and enjoyed strong FA Cup campaigns in the mid-1900s, but the increase of football clubs in the capital and falling attendances at the Manor Ground pushed Arsenal close to bankruptcy by 1910. Sir Henry Norris and William Hall in that year took over Arsenal, and planned to relocate the team to Highbury in order to improve their financial standing. Arsenal were relegated back to the Second Division in 1913, but the move to North London brought about larger attendances than ever before.

In 1919, Norris arranged for the club's promotion back to the First Division, in contentious circumstances. With increased financial resources, the club established themselves as a permanent fixture in the division and was better able to spend money on new players. In 1930, Arsenal beat Huddersfield Town to win its first major piece of silverware: the FA Cup. Success continued right throughout the decade, as they won five league championships and a further FA Cup in seven years. Following the Second World War, Arsenal won two more championships and a FA Cup, but their fortunes gradually declined. It was not until 1970 that the club won another trophy – the Inter-Cities Fairs Cup, a European club competition designed to promote trade fairs. A first league and cup double was completed a year later; by the end of the decade Arsenal added another FA Cup, beating Manchester United in the 1979 final. 1980 saw Arsenal lose two finals in quick succession, defeated by West Ham United in the FA Cup final and then to Valencia in the Cup Winners' Cup on penalties. The club won their first League Cup in 1987, but a year later failed to retain the trophy as outsiders Luton Town beat them in the final. In 1989, Arsenal won their first league championship in 18 years, courtesy of Michael Thomas' last-minute goal against closest challengers Liverpool in the final game of the season. The club did not build on their success, finishing fourth the following season, but regained the title in 1991. As champions, Arsenal were eligible to play in the European Cup, but their time in the competition ended abruptly as they were eliminated in the second round by Benfica.

The growth of commercialism in English football during the late 1980s and early 1990s paved the way for Arsenal and other prominent clubs to seek the possibility of setting up a new top-flight division. Unhappy with how income was distributed to the lower leagues and wanting to exploit television rights, Arsenal and 21 other First Division clubs handed a notice of resignation from the Football League by August 1991. The breakaway division, entitled the Premier League, was administered by The Football Association and received financial backing from Sky Television. Arsenal finished 10th in the inaugural season; the club did well in other competitions, winning a unique FA and League Cup double. They were victorious in the 1994 Cup Winners' Cup Final, and came close to defending the trophy in 1995, before losing to Real Zaragoza.

Arsenal added more league and cup doubles in 1998 and 2002, and in 2004 became the first club in Premier League history to win the title without a single defeat. The side, nicknamed "The Invincibles" remained unbeaten for 49 games, before losing to Manchester United in October 2004. In 2006, Arsenal reached their first UEFA Champions League final but Barcelona scored twice in the second half to win the competition. Later that year, Arsenal moved to the Emirates Stadium which commenced a transitional period. Though the club strengthened their position in the league's "top four" and frequently participated in the Champions League, they struggled to hold on to their best players. In 2011–12, Arsenal made their worst start to a season for 58 years, but a strong finish saw the club overtake rivals Tottenham Hotspur to third position. After nine years without silverware, the club beat Hull City to win the 2014 FA Cup Final and retained the trophy with a dominant display against Aston Villa in 2015, before clinching a record 13th in 2017. Arsenal won their fourteenth FA Cup in 2020, beating Chelsea.

Key
Key to league competitions:

 Premier League (Prem) – England's top football league, established in 1992
 Football League First Division (Div 1) – The first tier of English football until the inception of the Premier League in 1992. It was downgraded to the second tier, but remained the highest division of the English Football League until 2004. 
 Football League Second Division (Div 2) – The second tier of English football from its inception until 1992. It was downgraded to third-highest once the Premier League commenced and remained so until 2004.

 United League (United) 
 Southern District Combination (S Comb)  
 London League Premier Division (Lon Lge)

Key to colours and symbols:

Key to league record:
 Season = The year and article of the season
 Pos = Final position
 Pld = Matches played
 W = Matches won
 D = Matches drawn
 L = Matches lost
 GF = Goals scored
 GA = Goals against
 Pts = Points

Key to cup record:
 En-dash (–) = Arsenal did not participate
 DNE = The club did not enter cup play
 QR1 = First qualification round
 QR2 = Second qualification round, etc.
 Group = Group stage
 GS2 = Second group stage
 R1 = First round
 R2 = Second round, etc.
 R32 = Round of 32
 R16 = Round of 16
 QF = Quarter-finals
 SF = Semi-finals
 RU = Runners-up
 W = Winners

Seasons

Footnotes

References
General

Specific

External links
The History of Arsenal Football Club – 1886 to 1992 at Arseweb.com

 
Arsenal
Seasons
Seasons